Linden is a city in and the county seat of Cass County, Texas, United States. At the 2020 United States census, its population was 1,825.

Geography

Linden is located south of the center of Cass County at  (33.008026, –94.364328). U.S. Route 59 passes through the east side of the city, leading northeast  to Atlanta and south  to Jefferson.

Demographics

As of the 2020 United States census, there were 1,825 people, 917 households, and 603 families residing in the city.

At the 2010 census there were 1,988 people, 940 households, and 579 families living in the city. The population density was 640.4 people per square mile (247.5/km). There were 1,048 housing units at an average density of 297.5 per square mile (115.0/km). The racial makeup of the city was 77.88% White, 19.86% African American, 0.44% Native American, 0.18% Asian, 0.66% from other races, and 0.98% from two or more races. Hispanic or Latino of any race were 1.64%.

Of the 940 households 27.1% had children under the age of 18 living with them, 43.2% were married couples living together, 15.3% had a female householder with no husband present, and 38.3% were non-families. 36.0% of households were one person and 21.0% were one person aged 65 or older. The average household size was 2.20 and the average family size was 2.86.

The age distribution was 22.2% under the age of 18, 7.5% from 18 to 24, 23.0% from 25 to 44, 21.9% from 45 to 64, and 25.4% 65 or older. The median age was 43 years. For every 100 females, there were 85.1 males. For every 100 females age 18 and over, there were 80.1 males.

The median household income was $25,250 and the median family income  was $35,938. Males had a median income of $29,762 versus $21,731 for females. The per capita income for the city was $14,846. About 11.8% of families and 18.5% of the population were below the poverty line, including 22.2% of those under age 18 and 23.0% of those age 65 or over.

Education
Linden is served by the Linden-Kildare Consolidated Independent School District.

Notable people
 John Beasley, SWC Player of the year 1965 & 10 Year ABA player
 Don Buford, former Major League Baseball player born here
 Ed Hargett, All SWC QB and NFL QB for the Oilers and Saints
 Don Henley, lead singer and drummer of the Eagles, lived here as a child
 Scott Joplin, prominent ragtime composer and musician, was born here according to some historians
 Brig Owens, professional football player with the Washington Redskins
 T-Bone Walker, blues guitarist and singer born here

References

External links
 City of Linden official website

Cities in Cass County, Texas
Cities in Texas
County seats in Texas
Cities in the Ark-La-Tex
County seats in the Ark-La-Tex